Katja Beck (born 17 January 1991) is a Liechtensteiner footballer who plays as a defender for Staad and the Liechtenstein national football team.

Career statistics

International

References

1991 births
Living people
Women's association football defenders
Liechtenstein women's footballers
Liechtenstein women's international footballers